The 2018–19 Jordan FA Cup is the 39th season of the national football competition of Jordan. The winners of the competition earned a spot in the 2020 AFC Cup.

Preliminary round
The preliminary round was played between 20 and 23 February 2019.

Al Arabi 0 - 0 (4 - 3 P) Ittihad Jerash

Ma'an 6 - 1 Moghayer Al Sarhan

Shabab El Hussein 1 - 2 Al Khaledeya

Sama 2 - 3 Al Hashemeya

Al Jalil 2 - 2 (3 - 5 P) Al Hamra

Sama Al Sarhan 5 - 2 Ayn Karem

Al Khaleej 2 - 2 (4 - 2 P) Al Badeya

Al Wehda 2 - 3 Jerash

Dar Al Dawaa 1 - 0 Ader

Kfarsoum 3 - 0 Al Asalah

Round of 32
The round of 32 was played between 11 and 23 March 2019.

Round of 16
The round of 16 was played between 18 and 20 April 2019.

Quarter-finals
The first legs were played between 14 and 17 May 2019, and the second legs were played on 20 May 2019.

First leg

Second leg

Semi-finals
The first legs were played on 24 May 2019, and the second legs were played on 27 May 2019.

First leg

Second leg

Final
The final was played on 2 June 2019.

References

Jordan FA Cup seasons
King's Cup
Jordan